WELL-FM (88.7 FM) is a radio station licensed to serve Waverly, Alabama, United States. The station is owned by Alabama Christian Radio and the broadcast license is held by Alabama Christian Radio, Inc. It airs a Contemporary Christian music format.

The station was assigned the WELL-FM call letters by the Federal Communications Commission on August 22, 1997.

The WELL-FM calls were used for many years at the station on 104.9 FM in Marshall, Michigan, now known as WBXX, and previous to that on the station now known as WKFR in nearby Battle Creek.

References

External links
Official station website

ELL-FM
Contemporary Christian radio stations in the United States
Radio stations established in 1991
ELL-FM
1991 establishments in Alabama